Garth von Buchholz is a Canadian educator, blogger, digital strategist and author of fiction, non-fiction, poetry and drama. He was born in Winnipeg, Manitoba, and raised in Winnipeg, Montreal, Quebec and Vancouver, British Columbia. He lives on Vancouver Island in British Columbia. Von Buchholz received his undergraduate arts degree at the University of Winnipeg in 1994 and started his graduate studies in educational technology at the University of British Columbia in 2020. He currently works in government for the public service.

Von Buchholz began his career in print publishing as a writer and editor in 1988, and then later launched a new career in web publishing and content strategy in the mid-1990s. He earned his Certified Usability Analyst credentials from Human Factors International and has worked as a website communications manager for Investors Group (IGM Financial) and as the first corporate web manager for the City of Winnipeg. In 2010 he was listed as one of the Top 25 Content Strategists (#16) at the LavaCon technology conference in San Diego, California. From 2017 to 2020, he taught a four-week course on social media strategy at Royal Roads University in Victoria, British Columbia, Canada.

As an author, his works include Start-Up: Setting Up a New Media Business in Canada (2008) and several non-fiction books, such as The Encyclopedia of Manitoba(2007). He also wrote a book of poetry called Mad Shadows that was published in 2010. His plays include Land of Milk and Honey, which was professionally workshopped in 1994 by the Manitoba Association of Playwrights at Prairie Theatre Exchange. His other poetry and short stories have been published in various print and online journals. 
In addition to his literary writing, von Buchholz has written numerous arts and entertainment reviews as a professional journalist and critic for several newspapers and magazines, such as Maclean's, Prairie Fire, The Globe and Mail and Dance Magazine.

Von Buchholz was the dance critic for the Winnipeg Free Press from 1990 to 2004, where he also covered theater, films, music, art and books. He also reviewed books for the New York Journal of Books in New York City. In 2009, he produced the International Edgar Allan Poe Society, a popular online resource celebrating 19th century author Edgar Allan Poe and from 2012 to 2017 he created artistic photography for the Ballerina Project Canada.

His cultural volunteer work includes serving as a past board member for Ballet Victoria, Canadian Culture Online (Culture.ca), the University of Winnipeg's Global College, and Arts and Cultural Industries of Manitoba Inc.

Publications
 157 Tips for Improving eLearning Design (Contributor, 2017) 
 Mad Shadows (Author, 2016)
 Start-Up: Setting Up a New Media Business in Canada and Teachers' Guide (Author, 2008)
 Anthologies, Chapbooks, Magazines, Newspapers and Online Journals (Contributor, 1988–2016)
 Miracle Revival Meeting (Author, 2010)
 Land of Milk and Honey (Author, 2009)
 The Song of Songs (Author, 2009)

References

External links 
 Garth von Buchholz
 Global Island
 Dark Eye Glances 
 Ballerina Project Canada

Living people
Lecturers
20th-century Canadian poets
Canadian male poets
Writers from Winnipeg
Year of birth missing (living people)
20th-century Canadian male writers